James Vernon Mooney Jr. is an American politician who serves in the Florida House of Representatives from the 120th district as a member of the Republican Party. Prior to his tenure in the state house he was active in local politics in Islamorada, Florida.

Early life and education

James Vernon Mooney Jr. graduated from the University of Miami with a bachelor's degree.

Career

Local politics

Mooney served on the council in Islamorada, Florida, from 1998 to 2002, and during his tenure he served as mayor for one year. He defeated incumbent councilor Ken Philipson for a seat on the Islamorada council from the third district in the 2014 election.

Florida House of Representatives

Holly Merrill Raschein, the incumbent member of the Florida House of Representatives from the 120th district, was term-limited during the 2020 election and Mooney announced that he would run for the Republican nomination to succeed her in 2019. During the primary he was endorsed by Raschein. Mooney defeated Rhonda Rebman Lopez and Alexandria Suarez in the primary and defeated Democratic nominee Clint Barras in the general election.

During Mooney's tenure in the state house he served on the Environment, Agriculture and Flooding, Infrastructure and Tourism, and the Early Learning and Elementary Education subcommittees.

Electoral history

References

21st-century American politicians
Living people
Republican Party members of the Florida House of Representatives
University of Miami alumni
Year of birth missing (living people)